Richard Grenville-Temple, 2nd Earl Temple,  (26 September 171112 September 1779), was a British politician. He is best known for his association with his brother-in-law William Pitt with whom he served in government during Britain's participation in the Seven Years War between 1756 and 1761. He resigned, along with Pitt, in protest at the cabinet's failure to declare war on Spain.

Early life
The eldest son of Richard Grenville (1678–1727) of Wotton Underwood, Buckinghamshire, and of Hester, later Countess Temple, he was educated at Eton College, and in 1734 was returned to Parliament as member for the borough of Buckingham. In 1752, on the death of his mother, he inherited her titles together with the rich estates of Stowe and Wotton; and he then took the name of Temple in addition to his original surname of Grenville.

On 7 May 1737 he married Anna Chamber, an heiress.

Seven Years War

The turning point in his political fortunes was the marriage of his sister Hester in 1754 to William Pitt, later Earl of Chatham. Although Lord Temple had no outstanding qualities, his political career became linked with that of his brother-in-law. In November 1756 Temple became First Lord of the Admiralty in the ministry of Devonshire and Pitt. He was intensely disliked by George II, who dismissed both him and Pitt from office in April 1757. But when the coalition cabinet of Newcastle and Pitt was formed in June of the same year, Temple received the office of privy seal. He was the only member of the cabinet who supported Pitt's proposal to declare war with Spain in 1761, and they resigned together on 5 October.

Later career
From this time Temple became one of the most factious of politicians; he himself is said to have avowed that "he loved faction, and had a great deal of money to spare." He was on bad terms with his younger brother, George Grenville, when the latter became first lord of the treasury in April 1763, and he had no place in that ministry; but the brothers were reconciled before 1765, when Temple refused to join the government and persuaded Pitt to refuse likewise. A few weeks later the king offered terms to induce Pitt to form or join an administration; "a ministry directed by that great statesman," wrote William Edward Hartpole Lecky

"would have been beyond all comparison the most advantageous to the country; it had no serious difficulty to encounter, and Pitt himself was now ready to undertake the task, but the evil genius of Lord Temple again prevailed. Without his co-operation Pitt could not, or would not proceed, and Temple absolutely refused to take office even in the foremost place."

Pitt's continued refusal to join the first Rockingham ministry may have been partly due to Temple, but before the end of 1765 the old friendship between the brothers-in-law was dissolving; and when at last in July 1766 Pitt agreed to form a government, Temple refused to join, offended because, although offered the Treasury, he was not to be allowed an equal share with Pitt in nominating to other offices. Temple then began to libel Pitt; and in conjunction with his brother George he concentrated the whole Grenville connection in hostility to the government. After George Grenville's death in 1770 Lord Temple retired almost completely from public life.

Lord Temple was said to have been the author of several anonymous libels, and the inspirer of many more. Macaulay's comparison of him with a mole working below "in some foul, crooked labyrinth whenever a heap of dirt was flung up," from Horace Walpole, was partisan; but his character was rated very low by his contemporaries. In private life he used his wealth with generosity to his relations, friends and dependents. Pitt owed money to him. He was the principal backer behind The North Briton weekly newspaper, and he paid the costs incurred by John Wilkes in litigation. He also provided Wilkes with the freehold qualification which enabled him to stand for Middlesex in the election of 1768.

Although known as a man given to confrontation and strife, Earl Temple did get involved with one of London's most fashionable charities of his time. He served as a vice president for the Foundling Hospital from 1760 to 1768, which was dedicated to the salvation of the large number of children abandoned by their parents in London each day. It cannot be ruled out that his involvement in this charity was motivated purely by compassion. However, it is possible that it also had to do with the achievement of status and access to other notable supporters, such as the Duke of Bedford, Lord Vere Beauclerk, and the Earl of Dartmouth, among others.

In addition to the estates he inherited, Temple gained a considerable fortune by his marriage in 1737 with Anne, daughter and co-heiress of Thomas Chambers of Hanworth, Middlesex; a volume of poems by her was printed at the Strawberry Hill Press in 1764.

Cricket
Like his friend George Montagu-Dunk, 2nd Earl of Halifax, Grenville was keen on cricket. The earliest surviving record of his involvement in the sport comes from August 1741 when, as the patron and captain of the Buckinghamshire county team, he and Halifax organised the Northamptonshire v Buckinghamshire match at Cow Meadow, Northampton.

Death
Earl Temple died early in September 1779, aged 67, after a fall from his phaeton. The only issue of his marriage being a daughter who died in infancy, Temple was succeeded in the earldom by his nephew George Nugent-Temple-Grenville.

See also
Grenvillite

Notes

Bibliography
 
 
 

Attribution
 Endnotes:
The Grenville Papers (London, 1852), a considerable portion of which consists of Earl Temple's correspondence;
Horace Walpole, Memoirs of the Reign of George II., 3 vols. (London, 1847); Memoirs of the Reign of George III., 4 vols. (London, 1845 and 1894);
Earl Waldegrave, Memoirs 1754-8 (London, 1821);
Nathaniel William Wraxall, Historical Memoirs, edited by H. B. Wheatley, 5 vols. (London, 1884);
Correspondence of Chatham, edited by W. S. Taylor and J. H. Pringle, 4 vols. (London, 1838–40);
W. E. H. Lecky, History of England in the Eighteenth Century, vols. ii. and iii. (7 vols., London, 1892).

Further reading

 

1711 births
1779 deaths
Buckinghamshire cricketers
Earls Temple
English cricketers of 1701 to 1786
English cricketers
Richard Grenville-Temple
Knights of the Garter
Lord-Lieutenants of Buckinghamshire
Lords Privy Seal
Lords of the Admiralty
Grenville-Temple, Richard
Members of the Privy Council of Great Britain
People from Aylesbury Vale
Cricket patrons
18th-century philanthropists
People educated at Eton College